Burkely Duffield (born August 9, 1992) is a Canadian actor known for his roles as Eddie Miller in House of Anubis and as Holden Matthews in Beyond. His sister is actress and singer Victoria Duffield.

Career
Duffield made his screen debut in the 2006 drama film Under the Mistletoe. He then went on to play a main role in the Nickelodeon mystery series, House of Anubis. 

From 2017–2018, Duffield starred in the main role of Holden Matthews in the sci-fi drama series Beyond, which lasted two seasons. 
 
In August 2019, Duffield was cast in the Netflix slasher film There's Someone Inside Your House. The film was released on October 6, 2021.

Filmography

Film

Television

References

External links
 

1992 births
Living people
21st-century Canadian male actors
Canadian male child actors
Canadian male film actors
Canadian male television actors